The 2012–13 New York Islanders season was the 41st season in the franchise's history. The regular season was reduced from its usual 82 games to 48 due to a lockout.

For the sixth time in franchise history, the Islanders tied their longest homestand (of seven games) – beginning on February 24 and lasting through March 9 – in which they earned three wins during that span.

The Islanders qualified for the Stanley Cup playoffs for the first time since the 2006–07 NHL season.

Off-season

Regular season
On March 22, 2013, the Islanders were 12th in the Eastern Conference and a playoff spot seemed unlikely. The team would then earn points in 14 of 15 games, including 11 consecutive games with at least a point to officially clinch a playoff berth on April 23.

The Islanders tied the Minnesota Wild for the fewest shorthanded goals allowed, with 0.

Season standings

Schedule and results

|- style="background:#fcf;"
| 1 || January 19 || New Jersey || 2–1 || NY Islanders ||  || Nabokov || 16,170 || 0–1–0 || 
|- style="background:#cfc;"
| 2 || January 21 || Tampa Bay || 3–4 || NY Islanders ||  || Nabokov || 15,322 || 1–1–0 || 
|- style="background:#cfc;"
| 3 || January 24 || NY Islanders || 7–4 || Toronto ||  || Nabokov || 19,125 || 2–1–0 || 
|- style="background:#fcf;"
| 4 || January 25 || NY Islanders || 2–4 || Boston ||  || DiPietro || 17,565 || 2–2–0 || 
|- style="background:#ffc;"
| 5 || January 27 || NY Islanders || 4–5 || Winnipeg || OT || Nabokov || 15,004 || 2–2–1 || 
|- style="background:#cfc;"
| 6 || January 29 || NY Islanders || 4–1 || Pittsburgh ||  || Nabokov || 18,657 || 3–2–1 || 
|- style="background:#cfc;"
| 7 || January 31 || NY Islanders || 5–4 || New Jersey || OT || Nabokov || 17,625 || 4–2–1 || 
|-

|- style="background:#fcf;"
| 8 || February 3 || New Jersey || 3–0 || NY Islanders ||  || Nabokov || 11,558 || 4–3–1 ||
|- style="background:#fcf;"
| 9 || February 5 || Pittsburgh || 4–2 || NY Islanders ||  || Nabokov || 11,318 || 4–4–1 || 
|- style="background:#fcf;"
| 10 || February 7 || NY Islanders || 1–4 || NY Rangers ||  || Nabokov || 17,200 || 4–5–1 || 
|- style="background:#fcf;"
| 11 || February 9 || Buffalo || 3–2 || NY Islanders ||  || Nabokov || 12,608 || 4–6–1 || 
|- style="background:#fcf;"
| 12 || February 11 || Carolina || 6–4 || NY Islanders ||  || DiPietro || 9,622 || 4–7–1 || 
|- style="background:#cfc;"
| 13 || February 14 || NY Islanders || 4–3 || NY Rangers || SO || Nabokov || 17,200 || 5–7–1 || 
|- style="background:#cfc;"
| 14 || February 16 || New Jersey || 1–5 || NY Islanders ||  || Nabokov || 15,488 || 6–7–1 || 
|- style="background:#fcf;"
| 15 || February 18 || Philadelphia || 7–0 || NY Islanders ||  || Nabokov || 16,170 || 6–8–1 || 
|- style="background:#fcf;"
| 16 || February 19 || NY Islanders || 1–3 || Ottawa ||  || DiPietro || 18,595 || 6–9–1 || 
|- style="background:#cfc;"
| 17 || February 21 || NY Islanders || 4–3 || Montreal || OT || Nabokov || 21,273 || 7–9–1 || 
|- style="background:#cfc;"
| 18 || February 23 || NY Islanders || 4–0 || Buffalo ||  || Nabokov || 19,070 || 8–9–1 || 
|- style="background:#fcf;"
| 19 || February 24 || Carolina || 4–2 || NY Islanders ||  || Poulin || 10,048 || 8–10–1 || 
|- style="background:#fcf;"
| 20 || February 26 || Boston || 4–1 || NY Islanders ||  || Nabokov || 12,788 || 8–11–1 || 
|- style="background:#ffc;"
| 21 || February 28 || Toronto || 5–4 || NY Islanders || OT || Nabokov || 9,222 || 8–11–2 || 
|-

|- style="background:#cfc;"
| 22 || March 3 || Ottawa || 2–3 || NY Islanders || SO || Nabokov || 13,512 || 9–11–2 || 
|- style="background:#cfc;"
| 23 || March 5 || Montreal || 3–6 || NY Islanders ||  || Nabokov || 9,498 || 10–11–2 || 
|- style="background:#ffc;"
| 24 || March 7 || NY Rangers || 2–1 || NY Islanders || OT || Nabokov || 16,170 || 10–11–3 || 
|- style="background:#cfc;"
| 25 || March 9 || Washington || 2–5 || NY Islanders ||  || Nabokov || 14,819 || 11–11–3 || 
|- style="background:#fcf;"
| 26 || March 10 || NY Islanders || 1–6 || Pittsburgh ||  || Nabokov || 18,634 || 11–12–3 || 
|- style="background:#cfc;"
| 27 || March 14 || NY Islanders || 2–0 || Tampa Bay ||  || Nabokov || 19,204 || 12–12–3 || 
|- style="background:#cfc;"
| 28 || March 16 || NY Islanders || 4–3 || Florida ||  || Nabokov || 17,627 || 13–12–3 || 
|- style="background:#fcf;"
| 29 || March 19 || Ottawa || 5–3 || NY Islanders ||  || Nabokov || 10,668 || 13–13–3 || 
|- style="background:#fcf;"
| 30 || March 21 || Montreal || 5–2 || NY Islanders || || Poulin || 11,012 || 13–14–3 || 
|- style="background:#fcf;"
| 31 || March 22 || Pittsburgh || 4–2 || NY Islanders ||  || Nabokov || 14,888 || 13–15–3 || 
|- style="background:#cfc;"
| 32 || March 24 || Florida || 0-3 || NY Islanders ||  || Nabokov || 14,512 || 14–15–3 || 
|- style="background:#cfc;"
| 33 || March 26 || NY Islanders || 3–2 || Washington ||  || Nabokov || 18,506 || 15–15–3 || 
|- style="background:#cfc;"
| 34 || March 28 || NY Islanders || 4–3 || Philadelphia || SO || Nabokov || 19,906 || 16–15–3 || 
|- style="background:#fcf;"
| 35 || March 30 || NY Islanders || 0–2 || Pittsburgh ||  || Nabokov || 18,673 || 16–16–3 || 
|-

|- style="background:#cfc;"
| 36 || April 1 || NY Islanders || 3–1 || New Jersey ||  || Nabokov || 17,625 || 17–16–3 || 
|- style="background:#cfc;"
| 37 || April 2 || Winnipeg || 2–5 || NY Islanders ||  || Poulin || 11,819 || 18–16–3 || 
|- style="background:#ffc;"
| 38 || April 4 || NY Islanders || 1–2 || Washington || SO || Nabokov || 18,506 || 18–16–4 || 
|- style="background:#cfc;"
| 39 || April 6 || Tampa Bay || 2–4 || NY Islanders ||  || Nabokov || 16,170 || 19–16–4 || 
|- style="background:#cfc;"
| 40 || April 9 || Philadelphia || 1–4 || NY Islanders ||  || Nabokov || 13,888 || 20–16–4 || 
|- style="background:#cfc;"
| 41 || April 11 || NY Islanders || 2–1 || Boston ||  || Nabokov || 17,565 || 21–16–4 || 
|- style="background:#ffc;"
| 42 || April 13 || NY Rangers || 1–0 || NY Islanders || OT || Nabokov || 16,170 || 21–16–5 || 
|- style="background:#cfc;"
| 43 || April 16 || Florida || 2–5 || NY Islanders ||  || Nabokov || 15,922 || 22–16–5 || 
|- style="background:#cfc;"
| 44 || April 18 || NY Islanders || 5–3 || Toronto ||  || Nabokov || 19,676 || 23–16–5 || 
|- style="background:#cfc;"
| 45 || April 20 || NY Islanders || 5–4 || Winnipeg || SO || Nabokov || 15,004 || 24–16–5 || 
|- style="background:#ffc;"
| 46 || April 23 || NY Islanders || 3–4 || Carolina || SO || Nabokov || 16,601 || 24–16–6 || 
|- style="background:#fcf;"
| 47 || April 25 || NY Islanders || 1–2 || Philadelphia ||  || Poulin || 19,798 || 24–17–6 || 
|- style="background:#ffc;"
| 48 || April 26 || NY Islanders || 1–2 || Buffalo || SO || Nabokov || 19,070 || 24–17–7 || 
|-

|-
| colspan=9 align="center"|Legend:

Playoffs

The New York Islanders ended the 2012–13 regular season as the Eastern Conference's 8th seed. They were defeated 4–2 by the #1 seed Pittsburgh Penguins in the first round.

|- style="background:#fcf;"
| 1 || May 1 || NY Islanders || 0–5 || Pittsburgh ||  || Nabokov || 18,612 || 0–1 || Recap
|- style="background:#cfc;"
| 2 || May 3 || NY Islanders || 4–3 || Pittsburgh ||  || Nabokov || 18,624 || 1–1 || Recap
|- style="background:#fcf;"
| 3 || May 5 || Pittsburgh || 5–4 || NY Islanders || OT || Nabokov || 16,170 || 1–2 || Recap
|- style="background:#cfc;"
| 4 || May 7 || Pittsburgh || 4–6 || NY Islanders ||  || Nabokov || 16,170 || 2–2 || Recap
|- style="background:#fcf;"
| 5 || May 9 || NY Islanders || 0–4 || Pittsburgh || || Nabokov || 18,636 || 2–3 || Recap
|- style="background:#fcf;"
| 6 || May 11 || Pittsburgh || 4–3 || NY Islanders || OT || Nabokov || 16,170 || 2–4 || Recap
|-

|-
| Legend:       = Win       = Loss       = Playoff series win

Player statistics
Final stats
Skaters

Goaltenders

†Denotes player spent time with another team before joining the Islanders.  Stats reflect time with the Islanders only.
‡Denotes player was traded mid-season.  Stats reflect time with the Islanders only.
Bold/italics denotes franchise record

Notable achievements

Milestones

Transactions
The Islanders have been involved in the following transactions during the 2012–13 season:

Trades

Free agents signed

Free agents lost

Claimed via waivers

Lost via waivers

Lost via retirement

Player signings

Draft picks

New York Islanders' picks at the 2012 NHL Entry Draft, held in Pittsburgh, Pennsylvania on June 22 & 23, 2012.

Draft notes
 The New York Islanders' fourth-round pick went to the Vancouver Canucks as the result of a June 27, 2011, trade that sent Christian Ehrhoff to the Islanders in exchange for this pick.
 The Buffalo Sabres' fourth-round pick went to the New York Islanders as a result of a June 29, 2011, trade that sent Christian Ehrhoff to the Sabres in exchange for this pick.

See also 
 2012–13 NHL season

References

New York Islanders seasons
New York Islanders
New York Islanders
New York Islanders
New York Islanders